The 2011 Clásica de Almería was the 26th edition of the Clásica de Almería cycle race and was held on 27 February 2011. The race started and finished in Almería. The race was won by Matteo Pelucchi.

General classification

References

2011
2011 in road cycling
2011 in Spanish sport